Willailla is an unincorporated community in Rockcastle County, Kentucky, United States. It is located at the junction of Kentucky Route 70 and Kentucky Route 3273. It was named for the constant illness of a resident named Will Owens.

References

Unincorporated communities in Rockcastle County, Kentucky
Unincorporated communities in Kentucky